K. C. Jones  (May 25, 1932 – December 25, 2020) was an American professional basketball player and coach. He is best known for his association with the Boston Celtics of the National Basketball Association (NBA), with whom he won 11 of his 12 NBA championships (eight as a player, one as an assistant coach, and two as a head coach).  As a player, he is tied for third for most NBA championships in a career, and is one of three NBA players with an 8–0 record in NBA Finals series.  He is the only African-American coach other than Bill Russell to have won multiple NBA championships. Jones was inducted into the Naismith Memorial Basketball Hall of Fame in 1989.

Early life
Jones was born in Taylor, Texas, as the oldest of six children. The initials "K. C." were his given name; he inherited the same name as his father, a factory worker and cook, who himself was named after the fabled railroad engineer Casey Jones. When Jones was aged nine, his parents divorced and he moved to San Francisco, California, with his mother and two siblings. He learned to play basketball on a patch of gravel.

Jones attended Commerce High School in San Francisco where he played basketball and football.

Playing career

Jones played college basketball at the University of San Francisco and, along with Bill Russell, guided the Dons to NCAA championships in 1955 and 1956. During their time with the Dons, Russell and Jones led the team to a then-record 55-game win streak (including an undefeated 29–0 record during the 1955–56 season) and helped pioneer a play that later became known as the alley-oop.

Jones also played with Russell on the United States national team which won the gold medal at the 1956 Olympic Games in Melbourne, Australia, while defeating their opponents by an unsurpassed average margin of 53.5 points per game.

After completing college and joining the NBA, Jones considered a career as an NFL player, even trying out for a team. However, he failed to make the cut. During his playing days, he was known as a tenacious defender. Jones spent all of his nine seasons in the NBA with the Boston Celtics, being part of eight championship teams from 1959 to 1966, retiring after the Celtics' loss to the Philadelphia 76ers in the 1967 Eastern Division Finals. He was inducted into the Naismith Memorial Basketball Hall of Fame in 1989.

Jones is one of only eight players in basketball history to have won an NCAA championship, an NBA championship, and an Olympic gold medal, joining Bill Russell, Magic Johnson, Michael Jordan, Jerry Lucas, Clyde Lovellette, Quinn Buckner, and Anthony Davis. In NBA history, only his former teammates Russell (11 championships) and Sam Jones (10) have won more championships during their playing careers.

Coaching career
Jones began his coaching career at Brandeis University, serving as its head coach from 1967 to 1970. He served as an assistant coach at Harvard University from 1970 to 1971. Jones then reunited with former teammate Bill Sharman as the assistant coach for the 1971–72 NBA champion Los Angeles Lakers. During that season, the team won a record 33 straight games. He became the first-ever head coach of the ABA's San Diego Conquistadors on August 8, 1972.

One week after Jones' only season with the Conquistadors ended with his resignation, he signed a three‐year contract to succeed Gene Shue in a similar capacity with the Capital Bullets (name changed to Washington Bullets beginning in 1974–75) on June 18, 1973. During his three years in Washington, the Bullets had a 155–91 win‐loss record and arguably the most talented team in the league. Being swept by the Golden State Warriors in the 1975 NBA Finals and a seven-game loss to the Cleveland Cavaliers in the Eastern Conference Semifinals the following year resulted in Jones' contract not being renewed on May 7, 1976. He was replaced by Dick Motta three weeks later on May 28, 1976.

In 1983, Jones took over as head coach of the Boston Celtics, replacing Bill Fitch. Jones guided the Larry Bird-led Celtics to championships in 1984 and 1986. Also in 1986, Jones led the Eastern squad in the 1986 NBA All-Star Game in Dallas at the Reunion Arena, beating the Western squad 139–132. The Celtics won the Atlantic Division in all five of Jones's seasons as head coach and reached the NBA Finals in four of his five years as coach. In a surprise announcement, he retired after the 1987–88 season and was succeeded by assistant coach Jimmy Rodgers. Jones spent one season in the Celtics' front office in 1988–89, then resigned to join the Seattle SuperSonics as an assistant coach and basketball consultant for the 1989–90 season. He served as head coach of the Sonics in 1990–91 and 1991–92.

In 1994, Jones joined the Detroit Pistons as an assistant coach for one season. The Pistons' head coach at that time, Don Chaney, had previously played for Jones with the Celtics. Jones was also considered to once again coach the Celtics during the off-season in 1995. In 1996, Jones returned to the Boston Celtics, this time as an assistant coach for one season.

Jones returned to the professional coaching ranks in 1997, guiding the New England Blizzard of the fledgling women's American Basketball League (1996–1998) through its last  seasons of existence. The Blizzard made the playoffs in his second year as head coach, but they were summarily dispatched by the San Jose Lasers.

Personal life
Jones married Beverly Cain – the sister of his Olympic teammate Carl Cain – in 1959; they had five children together before they divorced. He had a sixth child when he remarried to Ellen. His son, Kipper, played as a guard at Bentley College. His daughter, Bryna, received a basketball and volleyball scholarship to attend the University of Hawaii.

Death
Jones died on December 25, 2020, at an assisted living center in Connecticut, aged 88. He had Alzheimer's disease.

NBA career statistics 

Source:

Regular season

Playoffs

Head coaching record

Source:

|-
| style="text-align:left;"|San Diego
| style="text-align:left;"|1972–73
|84||30||54||.357|| style="text-align:center;"|4th in Western||4||0||4||.000
| style="text-align:center;"|Lost in Division Semifinals
|-
| style="text-align:left;"|Capital
| style="text-align:left;"|
|82||47||35||.573|| style="text-align:center;"|1st in Central||7||3||4||.429
| style="text-align:center;"|Lost in Conference Semifinals
|- 
| style="text-align:left;"|Washington
| style="text-align:left;"|
|82||60||22||.732|| style="text-align:center;"|1st in Central||17||8||9||.471
| style="text-align:center;"|Lost in NBA Finals
|- 
| style="text-align:left;"|Washington
| style="text-align:left;"|
|82||48||34||.585|| style="text-align:center;"|2nd in Central||7||3||4||.429
| style="text-align:center;"|Lost in Conference Semifinals
|- ! style="background:#FDE910;" 
| style="text-align:left;"|Boston
| style="text-align:left;"|
|82||62||20||.756|| style="text-align:center;"|1st in Atlantic||23||15||8||.652
| style="text-align:center;"|Won NBA Championship
|- 
| style="text-align:left;"|Boston
| style="text-align:left;"|
|82||63||19||.768|| style="text-align:center;"|1st in Atlantic||21||13||8||.619
| style="text-align:center;"|Lost in NBA Finals
|-  ! style="background:#FDE910;"
| style="text-align:left;"|Boston
| style="text-align:left;"|
|82||67||15||.817|| style="text-align:center;"|1st in Atlantic||18||15||3||.833
| style="text-align:center;"|Won NBA Championship
|- 
| style="text-align:left;"|Boston
| style="text-align:left;"|
|82||59||23||.720|| style="text-align:center;"|1st in Atlantic||23||13||10||.565
| style="text-align:center;"|Lost in NBA Finals
|- 
| style="text-align:left;"|Boston
| style="text-align:left;"|
|82||57||25||.695|| style="text-align:center;"|1st in Atlantic||17||9||8||.529
| style="text-align:center;"|Lost in Conference Finals
|- 
| style="text-align:left;"|Seattle
| style="text-align:left;"|
|82||41||41||.500|| style="text-align:center;"|5th in Pacific||5||2||3||.400
| style="text-align:center;"|Lost in First Round
|- 
| style="text-align:left;"|Seattle
| style="text-align:left;"|
|36||18||18||.500|| style="text-align:center;"|(fired)||—||—||—||—
| style="text-align:center;"|—
|- class="sortbottom"
| style="text-align:left;"|NBA career
| ||774||522||252||.674|| ||138||81||57||.587
| style="text-align:center;"|—
|- class="sortbottom"
| style="text-align:left;"|ABA career
| ||80||30||54||.357|| ||4||0||4||.000
|- class="sortbottom"
| style="text-align:left;"|Total career
| ||858||552||306||.643|| ||142||81||61||.570

Awards and honors
Two-time NCAA Champion
1956 Olympic Gold Medal winner
12-time NBA Champion (eight as a player, two as a head coach, two as an assistant coach)
"Triple Crown" (NCAA, NBA, Olympic champion) winner
Five-time NBA All-Star Game head coach
Naismith Memorial Basketball Hall of Fame (class of 1989)
College Basketball Hall of Fame (class of 2006)
U.S. Olympic Hall of Fame (class of 1986 – as a member of the 1956 U.S. men's basketball team)
2016 Chuck Daly Lifetime Achievement Award

See also
List of NBA players with most championships

References

External links

 
 NBA.com profile
 Basketball Reference: K.C. Jones (as coach) 
 Basketball Reference: K.C. Jones (as player) 

1932 births
2020 deaths
African-American basketball players
African-American basketball coaches
All-American college men's basketball players
Amateur Athletic Union men's basketball players
American Basketball League (1996–1998) coaches
American men's basketball players
Basketball coaches from Texas
Basketball players at the 1956 Summer Olympics
Basketball players from Texas
Boston Celtics assistant coaches
Boston Celtics draft picks
Boston Celtics head coaches
Boston Celtics players
Brandeis Judges men's basketball coaches
Capital Bullets head coaches
College men's basketball head coaches in the United States
Detroit Pistons assistant coaches
Harvard Crimson men's basketball coaches
Los Angeles Lakers assistant coaches
Medalists at the 1956 Summer Olympics
Milwaukee Bucks assistant coaches
Minneapolis Lakers draft picks
Naismith Memorial Basketball Hall of Fame inductees
National Basketball Association championship-winning head coaches
National Basketball Association players with retired numbers
Olympic gold medalists for the United States in basketball
People from Taylor, Texas
Point guards
San Diego Conquistadors coaches
San Francisco Dons men's basketball players
Seattle SuperSonics assistant coaches
Seattle SuperSonics head coaches
United States men's national basketball team players
Washington Bullets head coaches
New England Blizzard
21st-century African-American people